OpenNeuro (formerly known as OpenfMRI) is an open-science neuroinformatics database storing datasets from human brain imaging research studies.

The database is available online.
Neuroimaging researchers, having performed an neuroimaging studies, may upload their data to the site. 
Third-party researchers may download the data and use it, e.g., for re-analysis.

OpenNeuro is run by the research group around Russell Poldrack, and they described the system in the scientific article Toward open sharing of task-based fMRI data: the OpenfMRI project from 2013,
and later in OpenfMRI: Open sharing of task fMRI data from 2015.

History 

OpenfMRI was predated by two other online neuroimaging databases: fMRI Data Center (fMRIDC) and the 1000 Functional Connectomes Project (FCP), available via the Neuroimaging Informatics Tools and Resources Clearinghouse Image Repository. 
The fMRIDC collected the same type of data as OpenfMRI, but distributes it via physical media. It no longer accepts data submissions. 
FCP collected data from resting-state fMRI studies.

In February 2018 OpenfMRI was officially renamed as OpenNeuro to reflect broader range of accepted data and switched to a new data submission and management platform.

See also
 Metascience

References

Neuroinformatics
Metascience
Open science